Julius "Jules" Hermanus Maenen (15 January 1932 – 11 February 2007) was a road and track cyclist from the Netherlands, who represented his native country at the 1952 Summer Olympics in Helsinki, Finland. There he was eliminated in the quarterfinals of the 4,000 m team pursuit, alongside Adrie Voorting, Daan de Groot and Jan Plantaz. Maenen did not finish his individual road race. After the Olympics he turned professional and finished second at the Dutch National Road Championship in 1957 behind Wim van Est.

See also
 List of Dutch Olympic cyclists

References

External links

 Dutch Olympic Committee

1932 births
2007 deaths
Dutch track cyclists
Dutch male cyclists
Cyclists at the 1952 Summer Olympics
Olympic cyclists of the Netherlands
People from Valkenswaard
Cyclists from North Brabant